National Highway 753C, commonly referred to as NH 753C is a national highway in India. It is a secondary route of National Highway 53.  NH-753C runs in the state of Maharashtra in India.

Route 
NH753C connects Jalna Bypass, Sindhkhed Raja, Dusrabid, Bibi, Sultanpur, Mehkar, Dongaon, Kenwad, Malegaon  Jahangir, Shelu bazar, Karanja, Bramhankhed, Kherda, Pimpalgaon, Vaghoda, Dashasar, Talegaon and Pulgaon in the state of Maharashtra.

Junctions  
 
  Terminal near Jalna.
  near Sultanpur
  near Mehkar
  near Malegaon
  near Malegaon
  near Shelu bazar
  near Karanja
  near Karanja
  Terminal near Pulgaon.

See also 
 List of National Highways in India
 List of National Highways in India by state

References

External links 

 NH 753C on OpenStreetMap

National highways in India
National Highways in Maharashtra